The mysterious letters (muqaṭṭaʿāt,  ḥurūf muqaṭṭaʿāt, "disjoined letters" or "disconnected letters") are combinations of between one and five Arabic letters figuring at the beginning of 29 out of the 114 chapters (surahs) of the Quran just after the Bismillāh Islamic phrase. The letters are also known as fawātiḥ or "openers" as they form the opening verse of their respective surahs.

Four chapters are named for their muqaṭṭaʿāt: Ṭā-Hā, Yā-Sīn, Ṣād and Qāf.

The original significance of the letters is unknown. Tafsir (exegesis) has interpreted them as abbreviations for either names or qualities of God or for the names or content of the respective surahs. The general belief of most Muslims is that their meaning is only known to Allah.

Inventory
Muqatta'at occur in Quranic chapters 2–3, 7, 10–15, 19–20, 26–32, 36, 38, 40–46, 50 and 68. Multiple letters are written together like a word, but each letter is pronounced separately.

Structural analysis 

There are 14 distinct combinations; the most frequent are ʾAlif Lām Mīm and Ḥāʾ Mīm, occurring six times each.
Of the 28 letters of the Arabic alphabet, exactly one half appear as muqatta'at, either singly or in combinations of two, three, four or five letters. The fourteen letters are:
ʾalif أ,
hā هـ,
ḥā ح,
ṭā ط,
yā ي,
kāf ك,
lām ل,
mīm م,
nūn ن,
sīn س,
ʿain ع,
ṣād ص,
qāf ق,
rā ر.
The six final letters of the Abjadi order (thakhadh ḍaẓagh) are unused. 
The letters represented correspond to those letters written without Arabic diacritics plus yāʿ ي.
It is possible that the restricted set of letters was supposed to invoke an archaic variant of the Arabic alphabet modeled on the Aramaic alphabet.

Certain co-occurrence restrictions are observable in these letters; for instance, ʾAlif is invariably followed by Lām. The substantial majority of the combinations begin either ʾAlif Lām or Ḥāʾ Mīm.

In all but 3 of the 29 cases, these letters are almost immediately followed by mention of the Qur'anic revelation itself (the exceptions are surat al-ʻAnkabūt, ar-Rūm and al-Qalam); and some argue that even these three cases should be included, since mention of the revelation is made later on in the surah. More specifically, one may note that in 8 cases the following verse begins "These are the signs...", and in another 5 it begins "The Revelation..."; another 3 begin "By the Qur'an...", and another 2 "By the Book..." Additionally, all but 3 of these suras are Meccan surat (the exceptions are surat al-Baqarah, Āl ʾImrān and ar-Raʻd.)

Lām and Mīm are conjoined and both are written with prolongation mark.
One letter is written in two styles. Letter 20:01 is used only in the beginning and middle of a word and that in 19:01 is not used as such. Alif Lām Mīm (الم) is also the first verse of Surah Al-Baqara, Surah Al-Imran, Surah Al-Ankabut, Surah Ar-Rum, Surah Luqman, and Surah As-Sajda.

Interpretations

Acrophony
Abd Allah ibn Abbas and Abdullah ibn Masud, as cited by Abu Hayyan al-Gharnati in his Bahr al-Muhit, are said to have favored the view that these letters stand for words or phrases related to God and His Attributes.

Sura content
Fakhr al-Din al-Razi, a classical commentator of the Qur'an, has noted some twenty opinions regarding these letters and mentions multiple opinions that these letters present the names of the Surahs as appointed by God. 
In addition, he mentions that Arabs would name things after such letters (for example, 'eye' as 'ع', clouds as 'غ', and whale as 'ن').
Amin Ahsan Islahi supported al-Razi's opinion, arguing that since these letters are names for Surahs, they are proper nouns. 
Hamiduddin Farahi similarly attaches symbolic meanings to the letters, e.g. Nun (ن) symbolizing "fish" identifying the sura dedicated to Jonah, or Ta (ط) representing "serpent" introducing suras that mention the story of Prophet Moses and serpents.

Ahsan ur Rehman (2013) claims that there are phonological, syntactic and semantic links between the prefixed letters and the text of the chapters.

Scribal intrusion or corruption
Among Western orientalists, Theodor Nöldeke (1860) advanced the theory that the letters were marks of possession, belonging to the owners of Qur'anic copies used in the first collection by Zayd ibn Thābit during the reign of the Caliph 'Uthmān. The letters ultimately entered the final version of the Qur'an due to carelessness. It was also possible that the letters were monograms of the owners. Nöldeke later revised this theory, responding to Otto Loth's (1881) suggestion that the letters had a distinct connection with the mystic figures and symbols of the Jewish Kabbalah. Nöldeke in turn concluded that the letters were a mystical reference to the archetypal text in heaven that was the basis for the revelation of the Qur'an. However, persuaded by Nöldeke's original theory, Hartwig Hirschfeld (1902) offered a list of likely names corresponding to the letters. Keith Massey (1996), noting the apparent set ranking of the letters and mathematical improbability that they were either random or referred to words or phrases, argued for some form of the Nöldeke-Hirschfeld theory that the "Mystery Letters" were the initials or monograms of the scribes who originally transcribed the sūras. Though, Massey explains that "the letters, which appear alone (qaf, nun), may not have the same purpose as the collection themselves", he furthermore admits that the "Mystery Letters" in Surah 42 violate his proposed ranking-theory, thus offering 2 possible scenarios for his theory.

The Hebrew Theory assumes that the letters represent an import from Biblical Hebrew. 
Specifically, the combination Alif-Lam would correspond to Hebrew El "god".
Abbreviations from Aramaic or Greek have also been suggested.

Bellamy (1973) proposed that the letters are the remnants of abbreviations for the Bismillah. Bellamy's suggestion was criticized as improbable by Alford T. Welch (1978).

Christoph Luxenberg in The Syro-Aramaic Reading of the Koran (2000)
proposed that substantial portions of the text of the Qur'an were directly taken from Syriac liturgy. His explanation of the disjoined letters is that they are remnants of indications for the liturgical recitation for the Syriac hymns that ended up being copied into the Arabic text.

Numerology
There have been attempts to give numerological interpretations. Loth (1888) suggested a connection to Gematria. Rashad Khalifa (1974) claimed to have discovered a mathematical code in the Qur'an based on these initials and the number 19, namely the Quran code or known as Code 19. According to his claims, these initials occur throughout their respective chapters in multiples of nineteen. which is mentioned in Sura 74:30

The Báb used the muqaṭṭaʿāt in his Qayyúmu'l-Asmáʼ. He writes in an early commentary and in his Dalá'il-i-Sab'ih (Seven Proofs) about a hadith from Muhammad al-Baqir, the fifth Shiʻi Imam, where it is stated that the first seven surat's muqaṭṭaʿāt have a numerical value of 1267, from which the year 1844 (the year of the Báb's declaration) can be derived.

Mystical

Sufism has a tradition of attributing mystical significance to the letters. 
The details differ between schools of Sufism; Sufi tradition generally regards the letters as an extension to the ninety-nine names of God, with some authors offering specific "hidden" meanings for the individual letters.

In 1857–58, Baháʼu'lláh, founder of the Baháʼí Faith, wrote his Commentary on the Isolated Letters (Tafsír-i-Hurúfát-i-Muqattaih, also known as Lawh-i-Áyiy-i-Núr, Tablet of the Light Verse). In it, he describes how God created the letters. A black teardrop fell down from the Primordial Pen on the "Perspicuous, Snow-white Tablet", by which the Point was created. The Point then turned into an Alif (vertical stroke), which was again transformed, after which the Muqatta'at appeared. These letters were then differentiated, separated and then again gathered and linked together, appearing as the "names and attributes" of creation. Baháʼu'lláh gives various interpretations of the letters "alif, lam, mim", mostly relating to Allah, trusteeship (wilayah) and the prophethood (nubuwwah) of Muhammad. He emphasizes the central role of the alif in all the worlds of God.

By removing the duplicate letters (leaving only one of each of the 14 initials) and rearranging them, one can create the sentence "نص حكيم قاطع له سر " which could translate to: "A wise and conclusive text has a secret".

Chants
Devin J. Stewart argues the letters are integral to the text and establish a rhyme and a rhythm, similarly to rhyming chants such as, intended to introduce spells, charms or something connected to the supernatural.

References

External links
 A comprehensive exposition of the theories surrounding the Muqatta'at
 The consonant şād in three Qur'anic chapters: Sād, Mary and al-A'rāf

Quran
Arabic words and phrases
Bahá'í terminology
Language and mysticism
Quranic verses